Analalava Airport is an airport in Analalava, Madagascar . It is at Latitude -14.6296997 Longitude 47.7638016 with Runway 1 length of 3937 feet. The airport has a field elevation of 345 feet and a magnetic variation of 10.286°W it is a regional airport that has scheduled airline service.

References

Airports in Madagascar
Mahajanga Province